Catalepis is a genus of plants in the grass family native to southern Africa. The only known species is Catalepis gracilis, commonly called cause grass, found in Lesotho and eastern South Africa.

See also 
 List of Poaceae genera

References 

Chloridoideae
Monotypic Poaceae genera
Flora of Southern Africa